Parafreutreta sobrinata is a species of tephritid or fruit flies in the genus Parafreutreta of the family Tephritidae.

Distribution
Zambia.

References

Tephritinae
Insects described in 1953
Diptera of Africa